Moira McLean (born 4 October) is an Australian television presenter, where she is known as an advertorial spokesmodel.

McLean in her career, made regular appearances on Good Morning Australia with Bert Newton on Network Ten which ran from 1992 until December 2005. She presented advertorials that were usually pretaped. McLean can be seen on home shopping channel TVSN which now features on FreeView, free to air digital TV as well as Foxtel.

On Good Morning Australia (GMA), McLean was introduced by Newton using the phrase "And now, here's Moira..." or some variation of this.

References

Australian television presenters
Australian women television presenters
Living people
Year of birth missing (living people)